The Division of Dalley was an Australian Electoral Division in New South Wales. The division was created in 1900 and was one of the original 75 divisions contested at the first federal election.  It was named for the colonial politician William Dalley and was located in the inner suburbs of Sydney, including Balmain, Glebe and Leichhardt. It was abolished in 1969.

For most of its history it was a safe seat for the Australian Labor Party, which held it without interruption from 1910 onward. In the 1930s it was a stronghold of the radical Premier of New South Wales, Jack Lang. Its most prominent member was Ted Theodore, who was deputy prime minister and treasurer in the Scullin government, having previously been Premier of Queensland. He was defeated in 1931 by the Lang follower and later Deputy Leader of Australian Labor Party (Non-Communist) Sol Rosevear, who was Speaker during the Curtin and Chifley governments.

Members

Election results

1901 establishments in Australia
Constituencies established in 1901
1969 disestablishments in Australia
Constituencies disestablished in 1969
Dalley